Blenina quinaria is a moth of the family Nolidae first described by Frederic Moore in 1882. It is found in the north-eastern Himalayas of India, western China, Vietnam, Taiwan, Peninsular Malaysia, Borneo, the Philippines and Japan (Kyushu: Oita, Kumamoto).

The wingspan is 35–40 mm. Adults are grey. The hindwings are pale fawnish grey with a darker border.

The larvae feed on Pterocarya species. They are apple green with yellow stripes bordered by fine red lines.

References

Moths described in 1882
Bleninae
Moths of Japan